Francis Harper may refer to:

 Francis Jacob Harper (1800–1837), U.S. Congressional Representative from Pennsylvania
 Francis Harper (biologist) (1886–1972), American naturalist
Hill Harper (born 1966), American actor and author

See also
 Frances Harper (1825–1911), American abolitionist and poet
 Frank Harper (born 1962), British actor